Donald B. Sherer is an American lawyer and politician.

Sherer, representing the Republican Party, defeated Democratic Party candidate Carmen Domonkos in the 2002 general election for Connecticut's 147th House of Representatives district, and succeeded Michael Fedele, who left the seat open to run for the Connecticut Senate. Sherer won a second term against Democrat Peter Gasparino in 2004. In 2006, Sherer lost to William Tong. He previously served on the Stamford Board of Representatives from 1975 to 1979 and again from 1991 to 2001.

References

Connecticut lawyers
Living people
Year of birth missing (living people)
20th-century American lawyers
21st-century American politicians
20th-century American politicians
21st-century American lawyers
Republican Party members of the Connecticut House of Representatives
Politicians from Stamford, Connecticut
Brooklyn Law School alumni
University of Connecticut alumni